Out of a Dream is the second studio album by American country music singer Reba McEntire, released on August 27, 1979, through Mercury Records. The first single from the album, Last Night, Ev'ry Night, was her first top 30 hit.  It was also the first to include a song written solely by McEntire.

The album was released in CD format twice, the second time with alternate album artwork. Despite some success with the singles released, the album did not chart on Billboard.

Track listing

Personnel
Adapted from the album credits.

 Billy Buett – banjo
 Jerry Carrigan – drums, percussion
 Gene Chrisman – drums, percussion 
 Johnny Christopher – guitar
 Buddy Harman – drums, percussion
 Hoyt Hawkins – backing vocals 
 The Jordanaires – backing vocals 
 Mike Leech – bass
 Gordon Kennedy – guitar
 Jerry Kennedy – guitar 
 Millie Kirkman – backing vocals  
 The Shelly Kurland Strings – strings (1, 3, 5, 6, 9) 
 Reba McEntire – lead and backing vocals
 Neal Matthews – backing vocals
 Laverna Moore – backing vocals 
 Weldon Myrick – steel guitar 
 Hargus "Pig" Robbins – acoustic piano, keyboards
 Henry Strzelecki – bass
 Gordon Stoker – backing vocals 
 Pete Wade – guitar
 Ray C. Walker – backing vocals
 Jacky Ward – lead vocals (5) 
 Bergen White – string and flute arrangements (1, 3, 5, 6, 9)
 Trish Williams – backing vocals

Production
 Bob Defrin – art direction, design (remastered edition)
 Jerry Kennedy – producer 
 Ken Kim – photography 
 Brent King – assistant engineer 
 Gary N. Mayo – digital remastering
 Mike Psanos – assistant engineer 
 MC Rather – mastering 
 Jim Schubert – art direction, design
 Tom Sparkman – engineer
 Tommy Strong – assistant engineer
 Traci Werbel – project coordinator

Charts
Singles – Billboard (North America)

References

1979 albums
Albums produced by Jerry Kennedy
Reba McEntire albums
Mercury Nashville albums